Ceredigion & Mid Wales NHS Trust was an NHS Trust in Wales.  The headquarters of the Trust was based in the Bronglais General Hospital, in Aberystwyth.  The Trust catered to the Ceredigion area, as well as large areas of south Gwynedd and north Powys.

It 2007 it was announced that Ceredigion & Mid Wales NHS Trust, Carmarthenshire NHS Trust and Pembrokeshire & Derwen NHS Trust would merge in 2008. The merger occurred as planned on 1 April 2008 with the newly merged trust named Hywel Dda NHS Trust.

Major hospitals
Major hospitals included:
Aberaeron Hospital
Bronglais Hospital
Cardigan and District Community Hospital
Tregaron Hospital

References

Defunct Welsh NHS Trusts
Ceredigion
Organisations based in Aberystwyth